The 1986 United States Senate election in Hawaii was held on November 4, 1986. 

Incumbent Senator Daniel Inouye was re-elected to a fifth term in office.

Democratic primary

Candidates
 Daniel Inouye, incumbent Senator

Results
Senator Inouye was unopposed for renomination by the Democratic Party.

Republican primary

Candidates
 Marvin Franklin, Waikiki pedicab driver and former U.S.M.C. Life Guard.
 Frank Hutchinson, businessman and retired United States Marine Corps officer

Results

General election

Results

See also 
 1986 United States Senate elections

References 

1986
Hawaii
United States Senate
Daniel Inouye